Aleksandr Shostak (born 1 March 1974) is a Belarusian gymnast. He competed at the 1996 Summer Olympics and the 2000 Summer Olympics.

References

1974 births
Living people
Belarusian male artistic gymnasts
Olympic gymnasts of Belarus
Gymnasts at the 1996 Summer Olympics
Gymnasts at the 2000 Summer Olympics
Gymnasts from Minsk